Driver Ramudu is a 1979 Indian Telugu-language action-drama film, produced by Nandamuri Harikrishna under the Ramakrishna Cine Studios banner and directed by K. Raghavendra Rao. It stars N. T. Rama Rao and Jayasudha, with music by Chakravarthy. The film was released in 35 centres across Andhra Pradesh on 2 February 1979. It was remade in Tamil as Lorry Driver Rajakannu (1981) and in Hindi as Tarkeeb (1984).

Plot
Ramu (N.T. Rama Rao) is a lorry driver who personally does not tolerate injustice anywhere. With his hard work, he soon becomes a lorry owner. He has a blind sister Meena (Roja Ramani) to whom he is very affectionate. A police inspector by the name of Raja Reddy (Sridhar), admiring Ramu's sincerity and truthfulness, comes forward to marry the blind girl. Meanwhile, Chukkamma (Jayasudha) runs a small hotel on the highway, and Ramu falls in love with her. Ramu renders help to one of Chukkamma's relatives, another lorry driver named Vasu (Satyanarayana). They become good friends. Kamal Babu (Mohan Babu) soon enters the scene, implicates Ramu in a smuggling case and succeeds in sending him to jail. How Ramu manages to prove his innocence and brings the story to its logical, happy end constitutes the rest of the narrative.

Cast
N. T. Rama Rao as Ramu
Jayasudha as Chukkamma
Rao Gopal Rao
Satyanarayana as Vasu
Allu Ramalingaiah
Mohan Babu as Kamal Babu
Sridhar as Inspector Raja Reddy
Mada
Chalapathi Rao
Roja Ramani as Meena
Kanchana as Kantam 
Chaya Devi
Jayamalini as Kalavati
Halam
Mamatha

Soundtrack

Music composed by Chakravarthy. Music released on SAREGAMA Audio Company.

Reception
The film celebrated a 100-day run at 14 centres and a silver jubilee (25 weeks) at 2 centres.

References

External links

1979 films
1970s Telugu-language films
Indian action drama films
Trucker films
Films directed by K. Raghavendra Rao
Films scored by K. Chakravarthy
Telugu films remade in other languages
1970s action drama films